Frank Edwin Hewitt Parker (20 September 1920 – 7 July 2017) was an Australian rules footballer who played with Hawthorn in the Victorian Football League (VFL).

Family
The son of Harry Robert Parker (1880–1963) and Ellen May Newbold (1880–1963), Frank Edwin Hewitt Parker was born in Richmond, Victoria on 20 September 1920.

He was the cousin of Ted Parker.

Notes

External links 

2017 deaths
1920 births
Australian rules footballers from Victoria (Australia)
Hawthorn Football Club players